USS Lydonia may refer to the following ships operated by the United States Navy:

 , a United States Navy patrol vessel in commission from 1917 to 1919
 , a survey ship in service with the United States Coast and Geodetic Survey from 1919 to 1947

See also
 , a patrol vessel

United States Navy ship names